The Smart Traveler Enrollment Program (STEP) is a service of the U.S. Department of State for U.S. citizens and nationals traveling and living abroad to enroll their trip with the nearest U.S. embassy or consulate.

Enrollment process 

Enrollment for STEP involves first going to the STEP website and creating a login. Then optionally filling out one's profile, including contact information (email and phone number) and residences abroad. After that, the itinerary for each specific trip can be entered on the website. Information that can be entered includes arrival and departure dates, destination country, closest embassy or consulate, purpose of visit, and emergency contact information.

Benefits of enrollment 

STEP enrollees should get alerts, warnings, and notifications related to the areas they are traveling to, if there is information about problems or risks in those areas during the travel dates. These should be a filtered subset of the full list of alerts and warnings issued by the U.S. Department of State, so this particular benefit can be obtained without enrolling in STEP by proactively checking and filtering the full alert list. The alerts and notifications are by default at the country level and may not capture events limited to specific regions of the country.

Itinerary and contact information filled in by STEP enrollees can also be used by the U.S. Department of State to help locate them in case of an emergency, and can also help with things like replacing a lost or stolen passport.

See also 

 Facebook Safety Check

References 

United States Department of State